Kacper Urbański (born 7 September 2004) is a Polish professional footballer who plays as an attacking midfielder for Bologna.

Football

Lechia Gdańsk
Born in Gdańsk, Urbański started playing football for a local footballing academy, AP Lechia Gdańsk. He joined the Lechia Gdańsk academy in 2016, playing at various youth levels with the club. He played for the Lechia Gdańsk II team for the first time on 14 November 2019 playing in the 8–0 win over Jantar Ustka. Urbański made his first senior appearance for Lechia Gdańsk the following month coming on as a substitute against Raków Częstochowa, becoming the second youngest player to have ever played in the Ekstraklasa. After the winter break, Urbański made his first start for the club against Piast Gliwice in the 1–0 win, becoming the youngest ever player to have started a match in the Ekstraklasa.

Bologna
On 1 February 2021, he joined Italian side Bologna. On 13 May 2021, Urbański made his debut for the club in the 2–0 home defeat against Genoa. He also became the youngest Polish player in Serie A history.

Honours
Bologna Primavera
Campionato Nazionale Under-17: 2021–22

References

2004 births
Living people
Sportspeople from Gdańsk
Sportspeople from Pomeranian Voivodeship
Association football midfielders
Polish footballers
Poland youth international footballers
Lechia Gdańsk II players
Lechia Gdańsk players
Bologna F.C. 1909 players
Ekstraklasa players
Serie A players
Polish expatriate footballers
Expatriate footballers in Italy
Polish expatriate sportspeople in Italy